Bittencourt, a spelling variant of Bettencourt, may refer to:

Amaro Soares Bittencourt, Brazilian Major General, diplomat, military and civil engineer, and the first recipient of the United States Legion of Merit (October 1942)
Danny Bittencourt Morais (born 1985), Brazilian central defender
Franklin Bittencourt (born 1969), Brazilian football coach and a former player
Leonardo Bittencourt (born 1993), German football player
Márcio Bittencourt (born 1964), retired Brazilian professional footballer
Rafael Bittencourt (born 1971), Brazilian guitarist, composer and co-founder of the band Angra
Rafael de Andrade Bittencourt Pinheiro (born 1982), Brazilian goalkeeper
Rodrigo Oliveira de Bittencourt (born 1983), Brazilian defensive midfielder
Simone Bittencourt de Oliveira, Brazilian singer and a major performer of MPB

See also
Estádio Jair Bittencourt, multi-use stadium located in Itaperuna, Brazil
Rodovia Régis Bittencourt (SP-230), a section of the BR-116 that connects São Paulo and Curitiba, Brazil

French-language surnames